Phillip Clarence Heemstra (9 December 1941 – 29 August 2019) was an American-South African ichthyologist. He was born in Melrose Park, Illinois, United States as the son of Clarence William Heemstra and his wife, Lydia (born Epcke). He attended school in Ottawa, Illinois, and completed a B.Sc. Zoology in 1963 at the University of Illinois at Urbana, Illinois, as well as his MSc degree (1968) and doctorate (1974) in marine biology at the University of Miami in Miami, Florida. He moved to live in South Africa in 1978.

At the time of his death, Heemstra was a curator emeritus of the South African Institute of Aquatic Biodiversity (SAIAB, formerly the J.L.B. Smith Institute of Ichthyology). He specialized in ichthyology and marine fish taxonomy.

Career 
Heemstra was, among other things, a biologist at the marine laboratory of the U.S. Department of Natural Resources in Florida, and from 1978 to 2001 a curator of fish at J.L.B. Smith Institute of Ichthyology in Grahamstown (now the SAIAB).

His work included research on systematics, biology (especially reproduction), zoo-geography and marine fish conservation, a survey of the fish diversity of Southern Africa and the western Indian Ocean, and the identification of marine fish for institutions in South Africa and overseas. He has also been a consultant to numerous publications and the author or co-author of several books, including Coastal Fishes of Southern Africa with Elaine Heemstra. He received many honours from various institutions.

Taxon described by him
See :Category:Taxa named by Phillip C. Heemstra

Memberships
He was a member of, among others, the Zoological Society of Southern Africa, the Ichthyological Society of Japan, the American Society of Ichthyologists and Herpetologists, and the Society of Systematic Biologists.

Taxon named in his honor 
Pseudanthias heemstrai, the orange-headed anthias is named after him.
 Upeneus heemstra Ublien & Gouws, 2014 (Heemstra goatfish)
Cociella heemstrai Knapp 1996
Pteropsaron heemstrai Nelson 1982 
Acropoma heemstrai Okamoto & Golani 2017
Aseraggodes heemstrai Randall & Gon 2006
Neocaristius heemstrai ((I. A. Trunov, E. I. Kukuev & Parin 2006)
Mascarenichthys heemstrai Schwarzhans & Møller 2007
Kenyaconger heemstrai D. G. Smith & Karmovskaya, 2003

Personal life 
Heemstra married Elaine Margaret Grant on 15 March 1991; Elaine has a son, Andrew Grant. Phil and his first wife, Valerie, have two daughters, Lydia and Julia.

References 

South African ichthyologists
1941 births
2019 deaths
People from Melrose Park, Illinois
University of Illinois alumni
Rosenstiel School of Marine and Atmospheric Science alumni